Bethany is a 2017 American horror film directed by James Cullen Bressack and starring Shannen Doherty, Tom Green, Stefanie Estes and Zack Ward.

Cast
Stefanie Estes	as Claire
Zack Ward as Aaron
Tom Green as Dr. Brown
Shannen Doherty as Susan
Anna Harr as Bethany / Young Claire
Leon Russom as Doctor Merman
Kevin Porter as Nurse Foster
Keith Jardine as Harrison

Reception
, the film holds a 29% approval rating on Rotten Tomatoes, based on seven reviews with an average rating of 5 out of 10.

References

External links
 
 

American horror films
2010s English-language films
Films directed by James Cullen Bressack
2010s American films